The United States Public Health Service Commissioned Corps (PHSCC), one of the eight uniformed services of the United States, has the authority to issue various awards, commendations, and other insignia to its members. These include individual honor awards, unit honor awards, service awards, training ribbons, special skill badges, and identification badges. The following PHSCC awards are listed in the service's order of precedence:

Personal awards and decorations

Unit awards

Service and campaign awards

Association and organization awards 
The following awards are awarded by various associations and organizations related the PHS mission and may be worn on the uniform (in order of precedence shown) when attending a function of that association:

Attachments worn on ribbons

Badges and insignia

Commissioned Corps officers may wear two authorized special skills badges and two breast or identification badges on the Corps uniform.  Badges of the USPHS take precedence over badges earned in other uniformed services.
 Assistant Secretary for Health / Principal Deputy Secretary for Health Officer-In-Charge Badge (ASHOIC)
 Surgeon General Badge (SG)
 Deputy Surgeon General Badge (DSG)
 Officer-in-Charge Badge (OIC)
 Chief Professional Officer Badge (CPO)
 Field Medical Readiness Badge (FMRB) 
 Recruiter Badge
 Associate Recruiter (AR) Badge
 Public Health Service Music Ensemble Badge
 Department of Health and Human Services Identification (HHS ID) Badge
 Other badges and insignia issued by other uniformed services

See also
 Awards and decorations of the United States government
 United States Public Health Service Commissioned Corps
 Uniformed services of the United States
 Awards and decorations of the National Oceanic and Atmospheric Administration
 Obsolete badges of the United States military

References

External links
 Commissioned Officers’ Awards Program
 U.S. Public Health Service Commissioned Corps Homepage
 USPHS Medals and Awards (CCI 500 Series)
 U.S. Public Health Service Commissioned Corps Ribbons

Awards and decorations of the United States Public Health Service